Desdemona is a character in William Shakespeare's play Othello.

Desdemona may also refer to:

Fictional characters 
 Desdemona, a cat character in the comic strip Mutt and Jeff
 Desdemona, a character in a Jimmy Buffett novel Where Is Joe Merchant?
 Desdemona, a character in the book Vurt by author Jeff Noon
 Desdemona, a character in the Midnighters trilogy by the author Scott Westerfeld
 Desdemona, a character in the children's Cairo Jim novels by Geoffrey McSkimming
 Desdemona, a character recreated as Kynaston, played by Billy Crudup in the film Stage Beauty
 Desdemona, a role from Shakespeare's Othello in the film O, renamed Desi Brable
 Desdemona, a soprano role in Giuseppe Verdi's opera Otello (1887)
 Desdemona, a soprano role in the 1816 opera Otello by Gioachino Rossini
 Desdemona Stephanides, a character in the book Middlesex by author Jeffrey Eugenides

Music 
 "Desdemona" (John's Children song), written by Marc Bolan and first recorded by John's Children
 "Desdemona", a song by Billy Merson
 Desdemona (Searchers song), a 1971 single by The Searchers
 "Desdemona", a song by The Allman Brothers from the 2003 album Hittin' the Note
 "Desdemona", a song by The Kids from "Fame"

Space 
 666 Desdemona, an asteroid
 Desdemona (moon), a moon of Uranus

Other uses 
 Desdemona (play), by Toni Morrison, 2011
 Desdemona: A Play about a Handkerchief,, by Paula Vogel, 1993
 Desdemona, Texas, a ghost town in Eastland, Texas
 ST Desdemona, a Cypriot tugboat

See also